Kang Ho-sun (born October 10, 1969) is a South Korean serial killer who was sentenced to death in 2010 for killing 10 women, including his wife and mother-in-law.

Murders
The murders took place in Ansan, Gyeonggi Province. His first victim was Bae, a 45-year-old karaoke bar employee, followed by three murders in 2007 including a 48-year-old housewife and a 21-year-old student from Suwon; their bodies were found in the woods. Kang was arrested by the police in 2009 and following the two-day investigation that ensued, he confessed to 10 murders. More victim remains have since been discovered and identified using DNA evidence. The families of the victims sued Kang for damages.

His crimes were depicted in 2022 South Korean TV series, Through the Darkness.

Trial and sentence

Upon confessing to murdering 10 women, Kang was found guilty of rape, murder and arson and was sentenced to death by a court in Ansan on April 22, 2009. While death by hanging remains on South Korea's statute books, an informal moratorium on the Korean death sentence has been in place since 1997.

Confirmed victims
Kang’s wife, 29, and his mother-in-law, 60, on October 30, 2005
Yoon Jung-hyun, 23, on September 7, 2006
Bae Kyung-mi, 45, employed at a karaoke bar in Gunpo, on December 14, 2006
Park Sung-ah, 37, employed at a karaoke bar in Suwon, on December 24, 2006
Park Jung-ja, 52, office employee at Hwaseong, on January 3, 2007
Kim Hae-young, 37, employed in a karaoke bar in Anyang, on January 6, 2007
Yeon Mi-young, 21, university student in Suwon, on January 7, 2007
Kim Soo-hee, 48, housewife in Suwon, on November 9, 2008
Ahn Young-ok, 19, university student in Ansan, on December 19, 2008

Prison life

During his early days in prison, Kang acted like a king of the other prisoners and never seemed apologetic or remorseful, according to a prison officer.
He said Kang seemed to realize his position only after Jeong Nam-gyu, a serial killer who was also sentenced to death, committed suicide because of the pressure of the death penalty.

See also
List of serial killers by country
List of serial killers by number of victims

References

1969 births
Living people
Male serial killers
People convicted of murder by South Korea
People from South Chungcheong Province
Prisoners sentenced to death by South Korea
South Korean people convicted of murder
South Korean prisoners sentenced to death
South Korean serial killers
Uxoricides